Osman Çakır (born 16 June 1967) is a retired Turkish football defender.

Honours
Kocaelispor
Turkish Cup: 1996–97

References

1967 births
Living people
Turkish footballers
Kocaelispor footballers
Association football defenders
Place of birth missing (living people)